Adonis flammea, large pheasant's eye, is a species of plant belonging to the family Ranunculaceae.

Description 
The plant is similar to Adonis annua but is more robust with large flowers, 2–3 cm in diameter, usually with narrow and oblong petals , dark scarlet sepals that are attached to the petals. It can distinguished by its mottled black achenes having a rounded bulge just below the peak. It blooms in spring and summer.

Distribution and habitat 
Calcareous fields in the Anatolia, the Levant Central and Southern Europe.

Taxonomy 
Adonis flammea , was described by Nikolaus Joseph von Jacquin and published in Florae Austriaceae 4: 29, in the year 1776.

Etymology 
Adonis :  according to Stearn's Dictionary of Plant Names, the genus names derives from the Adonis, a Greek deity: "The flower is supposed to have sprung from the blood of Adonis who was gored to death by a wild boar. He was beloved of Aphrodite and by some accounts was unsuccessfully wooed by her. Adonis was regarded by the Greeks as the god of plants. It was believed that he disappeared into the earth in autumn and winter only to reappear in spring and summer. To celebrate his return, the Greeks adopted the Semitic custom of making Adonis gardens, consisting of clay pots of quickly growing seeds."

Flammea :Latin epithet that means "flame-like".

Cytology 
Chromosome number of Adonis flammea (Fam. Ranunculaceae) and infraspecific taxa: n = 16.

Synonymy 
 Adonis anomala Wallr.
 Adonis caudata Steven
 Adonis flammea var. Anomala (Wallr.) Beck
 Adonis flammea subsp. Cortiana C.Steinb.
 Adonis flammea var. Cortiana (CHSteinb.) WTWang
 Adonis flammea var. Polypetala Lange
 Adonis flammea subsp. Polypetala (Lange) CHSteinb.
 Adonis involucrata S.Pons

References 

flammea
Flora of Lebanon
Taxa named by Nikolaus Joseph von Jacquin